Abū al-Mukarram Rabīʿah ibn Aḥmad ibn Ṭūlūn() was the fourth son of the founder of the Tulunid dynasty, Ahmad ibn Tulun. In 879, when his eldest brother Abbas rebelled against their father and fled to Alexandria and thence to Barqah, he remained in charge of affairs in Fustat until the return of Ahmad ibn Tulun. In 897, he rebelled against his nephew, Harun ibn Khumarawayh, in Alexandria, with the support of Berber troops. The uprising was defeated, and he was executed by lashing in the same autumn.

References

Sources
 
 
 

9th-century people
897 deaths
Tulunids
Egyptian rebels
9th-century executions
Medieval Alexandria